Dorothy Bennett (sometimes credited as Dorothy Hannah) was an American screenwriter, novelist, and playwright who worked in Hollywood from the 1930s through the 1940s.

Biography 
Bennett worked in advertising before finding a success as a playwright on Broadway. After Hollywood produced several big-screen adaptations of her plays, she moved to Los Angeles and took on work at MGM as a screenwriter. Bennett was married to Link Hannah, who she met while working in advertising. The pair, who occasionally wrote plays together, had three children.

Selected filmography 

 The Brasher Doubloon (1947)
 Do You Love Me (1946)
 Patrick the Great (1945)
 Sensations of 1945 (1944)
 Show Business (1944)
 All by Myself (1943)
 Mister Big (1943)
 Follow the Band (1943)
 It Comes Up Love (1943)
 When Johnny Comes Marching Home (1942)
 Always in My Heart (1942)
 Daughters Courageous (1939)
 Life Begins with Love (1937)
 Wives Never Know (1936)

References 

1907 births
1988 deaths
People from DeKalb County, Indiana
Novelists from Indiana
20th-century American novelists
20th-century American dramatists and playwrights
20th-century American women writers
Screenwriters from Indiana
American women novelists
American women dramatists and playwrights
American women screenwriters
20th-century American screenwriters